Luther Saunders (born 26 August 1906, date of death unknown) was a Jamaican cricketer. He played in two first-class matches for the Jamaican cricket team in 1950/51 and 1951/52.

See also
 List of Jamaican representative cricketers

References

External links
 

1906 births
Year of death missing
Jamaican cricketers
Jamaica cricketers
People from Saint Mary Parish, Jamaica